Matthew Foy (born May 18, 1983) is a Canadian professional ice hockey player who is currently playing for the Dundas Real McCoys in the Allen Cup.

Playing career
Born  in Oakville, Ontario, Foy was drafted by the Minnesota Wild 175th overall in the 2002 NHL Entry Draft. He began his hockey career with Merrimack College in the NCAA.  From there he moved on to the Ottawa 67's of the OHL. In the 2002–03 season with the 67's Foy formed one of the most dominating tandems in the history of the OHL with teammate Corey Locke. He spent the majority of the 2005–06 and 2006–07 seasons with the Houston Aeros, Minnesota's top farm team in the American Hockey League (AHL). In the 2007–08 season, he was with the Wild all season and played 28 games, scoring four goals with four assists and 28 penalty minutes.

On July 14, 2008, Foy was signed as a free agent by the St. Louis Blues to a one-year contract. He was subsequently assigned to the Blues AHL affiliate, the Peoria Rivermen to begin the 2008–09 season. On March 11, 2009, after receiving a six-game suspension for leaving the bench to fight the Aeros' John Scott, Foy left the Rivermen, with the team citing "personal reasons".  He only played 4 games during the season after being stricken by a sports hernia in training camp.

On September 28, 2009, Foy signed a one-year contract with the Arizona Sundogs of the Central Hockey League. Foy was injured on the opening night of the 2009–10 season and was later granted leave by the CHL in mid November. He returning to finish in 7 games with the Sundogs for 3 assists before succumbing to season-ending injury on February 13, 2010.

Foy came back after sitting out the 2010–11 season and signed with the Stockton Thunder of the ECHL, enjoying his highest offensive output since the 2006-07 season when he led Houston with 27 goals and 50 points.

On July 4, 2012 it was announced that Foy has signed a one-year contract with six time German champion Eisbären  Berlin. In the next 3 years, he played for Berlin and scored 75 points and 33 goals in 130 games.

For the 2015–16 season, he left the DEL with Berlin and signed a contract with the Eispiraten Crimmitschau from the DEL2.

Career statistics

Awards
2002–03 OHL  First Team All-Star
2002–03 OHL Jim Mahon Memorial Trophy
2002–03 CHL  Second Team All-Star
2012–13 DEL  Champion with the Eisbären Berlin

References

External links

1983 births
Living people
Arizona Sundogs players
Canadian ice hockey right wingers
Eisbären Berlin players
ETC Crimmitschau players
Houston Aeros (1994–2013) players
Sportspeople from Oakville, Ontario
Merrimack Warriors men's ice hockey players
Minnesota Wild draft picks
Minnesota Wild players
Ottawa 67's players
Peoria Rivermen (AHL) players
Stockton Thunder players
Ice hockey people from Ontario
Canadian expatriate ice hockey players in Germany